HD 102272 b is an extrasolar planet approximately 1,200 light-years away in the constellation of Leo.  The planet was discovered orbiting the K-type giant star HD 102272 in 2008.  The planet was discovered by the radial velocity method, using the Hobby-Eberly Telescope.  Another planet, HD 102272 c, was also discovered orbiting the same star.  The discovery was announced in June 2008. HD 102272 b orbits at an average of 0.614 astronomical units away from its star, with a mass at least 5.9 ± 0.2 times that of Jupiter.

See also 
 HD 102272 c

References

External links 

 
 

Leo (constellation)
Giant planets
Exoplanets discovered in 2008
Exoplanets detected by radial velocity